Arabology is the debut album by electronic duo Y.A.S. The album was released in France on 8 June 2009. The lead single, "Get It Right", was released in June 2009.

The duo began recording the album in 2007. Mirwais Ahmadzaï wanted to create an electronic music album that had an Arab identity. Moreover, he wanted to present a different representation of Arab culture to balance the view of Arabs as "terrorists" often publicized in the Western media.

Track listing

Samples
"A-Man" contains an excerpt from "Man Machine" as performed by Kraftwerk.

Personnel
The following people contributed to Arabology:

Yasmine Hamdan – vocals, vocal engineering
Mirwais Ahmadzaï – keyboard, guitar, vocals, programming, engineering, mixing
François Poggio – guitar
Stephane Briat – vocal engineering 
Simon Davey – mastering
Stéphane Sednaoui – photography

Release history
The album was released in two versions: a single disc version, which used Opendisc technology to offer extras via a website, and a digital version which included a digital booklet.

Charts

References

2009 debut albums
Arabic-language albums
Y.A.S. albums